Chillin' is an album by saxophonist David "Fathead" Newman which was recorded in 1998 and released on the HighNote label the following year.

Reception

In his review on Allmusic, Scott Yanow states "This straight-ahead effort is pretty definitive of his jazz abilities, for it has Newman making four appearances on tenor, two on soprano, and one apiece on flute and alto. ... Highly recommended". In JazzTimes, Willard Jenkins noted "Standing in the middle of a mountain stream, barefoot and coverall-ed on the CD cover, all’s seemingly right in Fathead’s world. And that sense of comfort and good vibes permeates this disc, whose title is quite apt. Newman embraces this music with the seasoned improviser’s special coupling of swing and relaxation. There is a level of communication reached when bandleaders have the luxury of long-term work with familiars". On All About Jazz Douglas Payne said "This compelling, easily enjoyable set shows the many sides of David Newman's personality – and his distinctive and vital talents on a variety of reed instruments too".

Track listing 
 "Take the Coltrane" (Duke Ellington) – 5:51
 "Return to Paradise" (Dimitri Tiomkin, Ned Washington) – 5:51
 "The Whole Tzimmes" (David "Fathead" Newman) – 5:58
 "These Foolish Things" (Jack Strachey, Holt Marvell, Harry Link) – 9:37
 "Invitation" (Bronisław Kaper, Paul Francis Webster) – 5:32
 "Chillin'" (Newman) – 6:34
 "Caravan" (Juan Tizol, Ellington, Irving Mills) – 4:42
 "Red Top" (Lionel Hampton, Ben Kynard) – 4:26

Personnel 
David "Fathead" Newman – tenor saxophone, soprano saxophone, alto saxophone, flute
John Hicks – piano 
Bryan Carrott – vibraphone
Steve Novosel – bass 
Winard Harper – drums
Cadino Newman – vocals (tracks 7 & 8)

References 

David "Fathead" Newman albums
1999 albums
HighNote Records albums
Albums recorded at Van Gelder Studio